Below is a list of television series and feature films based on Dark Horse Comics publications, including its various imprints. This list includes live action and animated television series and films.

Television

Live-action

Specials

Animated series

Motion comics

Pilots

Films

Live-action

Animated films

Shorts

Reception

Box office

Critical and public reception

See also
 Dark Horse Entertainment
 List of unproduced Dark Horse Comics projects

References

External links
 Dark Horse Entertainment on Internet Movie Database
 Official Website - Dark Horse Entertainment

 
Comics publications
 
Dark Horse Comics
Dark Horse Comics
 
Lists of films and television series